Pada is a 2022 Indian Malayalam-language Political social-thriller film directed by Kamal K. M. (who directed I.D.) and starring Kunchacko Boban,  Joju George, Vinayakan, and Dileesh Pothan. The film is based on a true incident that occurred in 1996 when the then Palakkad collector was held hostage. The film was released on 11 March 2022 and opened to widespread critical acclaim.

Premise 
The film is based on a true incident that occurred in 1996 when the then Palakkad collector was held hostage. Pada begins with showing how five men in different places planning for something big to be done by them which might trigger a revolution. The group arrives at their destination, and waits for the collector to come. After a day's wait, they get into collector's chamber and forcibly ties him by chasing others around him out. On the collector's insistence to reveal, they identify themselves as 'Ayyankali Pada', activists working for the welfare of tribals and their current resolve is to keep the collector as a hostage and bargain with the current government to repeal the controversial Adivasi Land Amendment Bill. The miserable plight of Adivasi community is drawn more literally on the screen through the exchanges between the collector and the five men, the former however sympathizes with their plight and align with their cause.

Cast

 Kunchacko Boban as Rakesh Kanhangad (based on Ramesh Kanhangad)
 Joju George as Aravindan Mannur (based on Ajayan Mannur)
 Vinayakan as Balu Kallaar (based on Babu Kallara)
 Dileesh Pothan as "Kutty"/Narayanankutty (based on Vilayodi Shivankutty)
 Prakash Raj as Chief Secretary N. Rajasekharan I.A.S.
 Unnimaya Prasad as Mini K.S., Kutty's wife
 Arjun Radhakrishnan as Ajay Shripad Dange I.A.S., Palakkad Collector (based on W. R. Reddy) 
 Indrans as Com. Kannan Mundur (based on Mundur Ravunni)
 Salim Kumar as Sessions Judge, Justice Thankappan Achari
 Jagadish as P. Krishnakumar I.A.S.
 T. G. Ravi as Adv. Jayapalan, Mediator
 Savithri Sreedharan as Kunji
 V. K. Sreeraman as then Kerala Chief Minister E. K. Nayanar
 Shine Tom Chacko as Sadik Hasanar, Collector's Gunman
 Gopalan Adat as Usman
 Sudheer Karamana as Francis Chacko I.P.S.
 Dasan Kongad as Kumaran
 Hari Kongad
 K Rajesh
 Sibi Thomas as C. I. Joy Joseph
 Bitto Davis as DySP K. P. Thomas
 Vivek Vijayakumaran as Sachin Aggarwal I.P.S.
 James Elia as K Chandran I.P.S.
 Sajitha Madathil as Padmini Ramachandran
 Gopan Mangat as K. Ravi
 Kottayam Ramesh
 Shankar Ramakrishnan
 Devendranath Shankarnarayanan
 Unni Vijayan
 Kannan Nayar
 Sunil Annur
 Rajeevan Vellur
 Haris Saleem
 Nithin George
 Ishitha Sudheesh as Rosa, Balu's daughter
 Master Davinchi as Azad, Balu's son
 Santhosh Keezhattur as N. P. Ravichandran I.A.S

 Raavi Kishore as Malini,Ajay Shripad Dange's wife

Soundtrack

The original soundtrack is composed by Vishnu Vijay.

Production 
The film began production in 2019 with Kunchacko Boban, Joju George, Vinayakan and Dileesh Pothan. Mammootty was reported to make a cameo. Shooting finished by August 2019.

Reception 
The film released to highly positive reviews. 

Anna M. M. Vetticad of Firstpost rated the film 4 out of 5 stars and wrote, “Pada is a lesson for students of cinema on how to keep a true story engaging even for a person who has read the facts, including the sensational climax, available to the public.” She added, “...Pada steers clear of cinematic loudness. In this, it is far removed from formulaic, machoistic commercial Indian cinema of all languages, which substitutes hollow, violent machismo for valour.” but said there was a “frustrating deficiency” of gender diversity in the film. Vetticad ranked it eighth on her year-end list of best Malayalam films for the publication. Anna Mathews of A critic from The Times of India gave the film a rating of four out of five and said that "Basically, writer-director Kamal KM used a striking incident in the State's political history and converted it into a good cinema with a compelling, thought-provoking screenplay, perfectly captured scenes that convey not only the very different times but also the working of our government offices, and great acting. This is a highly recommended film for all". S. R. Praveen of The Hindu called the film "a sympathetic portrayal of the justified anger of the oppressed". Gautham VS of The Indian Express opined that "The movie is a powerful political statement and throws light on the policies of changing governments, be it the left or the right, who diluted the tribal laws over the years in favour of corporate interests by taking away the rights of tribal communities over forests". Sreeju Sudhakaran of LatestLY gave the film a rating of 4/5 and wrote "Kunchako Boban’s Malayalam Film Is Bold, Arresting Callback to a Revolt Against Systemic Indifference".

References

External links 

2022 films
2022 thriller films
Indian political thriller films
2020s Malayalam-language films
Films set in 1996
Political films based on actual events
Indian films based on actual events
Fictional portrayals of the Kerala Police
Films about the caste system in India
Films about hostage takings
Films about activists
History of Kerala on film
Films shot in Palakkad